Sungai Tua is a state constituency in Selangor, Malaysia, that is represented in the Selangor State Legislative Assembly from 1995 to 2004, and then from 2018 onwards.

The state constituency was created in the 1994 redistribution and was mandated to return a single member to the Selangor State Legislative Assembly under the first past the post voting system. , the State Assemblyman for Taman Templer is Amirudin Shari from PKR, which is part of the state's ruling coalition, Pakatan Harapan (PH), and is currently the incumbent Menteri Besar

Demographics

History

Polling districts 
According to the federal gazette issued on 30 March 2018, the Sungai Tua constituency is divided into 12 polling districts.

Representation history

Election results

References

Bibliography

Selangor state constituencies